Morichika is a Bangladeshi crime thriller streaming television series directed by Shihab Shaheen. It aired on Chorki on 12 July 2021.

Cast
 Afran Nisho as Salaam Sharif Babu
 Mahiya Mahi as Bonni 
 Siam Ahmed as Police Officer Shakil
 Farhan Ahmed Jovan as Jewel
 Abdullah Rana
 Naresh Bhuiyan as Police Officer Rafique
 A.K. Azad Shetu as Police Officer Mojid 
 Naznin Hasan Chumki	
 Chanchal Mahmud
 Farzana Rikta

Release
Chorki dropped the trailer of the series on 2 June 2021 on social media. And the series was premired on 12 July 2021 on the launching day of Chorki.

Reception
Morichika received mostly negative reviews from the audience. While reviewing for The Business Standard,  Sayed Arafat Zubayer praised the direction, cinematography, and the background score of the series.

Awards

References

External links
 

Chorki original programming
Bengali-language web series
Bangladeshi web series
2021 web series debuts
2021 Bangladeshi television series debuts
Bangladeshi crime drama television series